LTV may refer to:

Television
 Lagos Television, a TV channel in Nigeria.
 Latvijas Televīzija, Latvian Television
 LRT televizija, formerly LTV, Lithuanian National Television
 LTV Ethiopia, a private satellite TV channel in Ethiopia
 Lumiere TV, a TV channel in Cyprus

Other
 Labor theory of value, a theory of value in Marxist economics
 Lichfield Trent Valley railway station, England; National Rail station code LTV
 Ling-Temco-Vought, former US conglomerate and aerospace firm, later LTV Corporation, LTV Steel
 Vought, formerly named LTV Aerospace while owned by Ling-Temco-Vought
 Loan-to-value ratio, of an asset
 Customer lifetime value in marketing, also known as life-time value (LTV)
 Lunar Terrain Vehicle -- lunar surface rover for the Artemis program.

See also